The SER Q class was a class of 0-4-4T steam locomotives of the South Eastern Railway. The class was designed by James Stirling and introduced in 1881.

Construction
Prior to the appointment of James Stirling as Locomotive Superintendent of the South Eastern Railway (SER) in 1878, that railway possessed only a small number of tank locomotives suitable for the London suburban passenger services. There were twelve 0-4-2WT of the 205 class (later G class) dating from 1863–64; seven 0-4-4WT of the 235 class (later J class) dating from 1866; six 0-4-2WT of the 73 class (later H class) dating from 1867–69; and nine 0-4-4T of the 58 class (later M class) dating from 1877–78.

The SER had opened a connection to the London, Chatham and Dover Railway in June1878 giving access to Blackfriars station, the Widened Lines and thus the Great Northern Railway. Tender locomotives were not suitable for working this route, and nor were many of the existing tank engines which were not powerful enough. They were sold back to the Metropolitan Railway in November 1883.

In his previous post with the Glasgow and South Western Railway (G&SWR), Stirling had designed an 0-4-4T for suburban passenger services, the G&SWR 1 class. He kept copies of the drawings and used these as the basis for a new class for the SER, which became the SER Q class. One hundred and eighteen locomotives were built between 1881 and 1897, of which 60 were built by Neilson and Company; 48 by the SER at Ashford Works; and ten by Sharp, Stewart and Company.

The first 34, built between 1881 and 1885, had bogies of wheelbase  having wheels of  diameter. These bogies had a fixed centre pin and were troublesome, and so beginning in 1887 new locomotives had a better bogie design based upon that of the contemporary 4-4-0s of the F class.

Rebuilding
The locomotives passed to the South Eastern and Chatham Railway in 1899 and 55 were rebuilt by Harry Wainwright to class Q1 between 1903 and 1919.

Numbering
Thirty-two unrebuilt locomotives survived into Southern Railway ownership on 1 January 1923 with random numbers between 6 and 424. All had been withdrawn by 1929.

References

Bibliography
 
 
 

Q
0-4-4T locomotives
Railway locomotives introduced in 1881
Scrapped locomotives
Standard gauge steam locomotives of Great Britain